Returner may refer to:

Returner, a 2002 Japanese science fiction film
"Returner (Yami no Shūen)", a single released by Gackt in 2007
Kick returner, a gridiron football position